ULB may refer to:

the IATA code for Ulei Airport in Ulei, Vanuatu
"Ultralight Beam", a song by American hip hop artist Kanye West
Underwater locator beacon, a device fitted to aviation flight recorders
Free University of Brussels (Université libre de Bruxelles), a university in Belgium between 1834 and 1969
Université libre de Bruxelles, a university in Belgium from 1970 onwards 
Urban local body, a representative body in India